The Kitasoo/Xaixais First Nation, also known as the Kitasoo/Xaixais Nation, is the band government of the First Nations people of Klemtu, British Columbia, Canada.  The band comprises two ethnic groups who share an ancient alliance, the Kitasoo, a Tsimshian group, and the Xai'xais, a north-wakashan speaking group.  The government is a member of the Oweekeno-Kitasoo-Nuxalk Tribal Council and a member of the Tsimshian First Nations treaty council.

Indian reserves
Indian reserves under the administration of the Kitasoo/Xaixais Nation are:

Canoona 2, on Princess Royal Island, north shore of Graham Reach, 219.30 ha.
Dil-ma-sow 5, on Kent Islet southwest of the Princess Royal Islands, 1.90 ha.
Gander Island 14, on one of the islands of the Moore Group off the west coast of Aristazabal Island in Hecate Strait, 121.40 ha.
Goo-ewe 8, on Grant Anchorage, north side of Price Island, 2.0 ha.
Kdad-eesh 4, on west shore of Aristazabal Island, 2.0 ha.
Kinmakanksk 6, on the southwest shore of Princess Royal Island on Laredo Channel, 11.70 ha.
Kitasoo 1, on east shore of Swindle Island at Klemtu, 334.70 ha.
Lattkaloup 9, on Princess Royal Island at mouth of Fowles Creek, Laredo Inlet, 0.40. ha.
Mary Cove 12, on Mary Cove, west shore of Roderick Island, 1.0 ha.
Oatswish 13, on most northerly tip of Mussel Inlet, north of Mathieson Channel, Milbanke Sound, 2.10 ha.
Quckwa 7, on Kitasu Bay, west shore of Swindle Island, 6.10 ha.
Saint Joe 10, on Princess Royal Island at outlet of Bloomfield Lake into Laredo Inlet, 0.50 ha.
Skilak 14, on Griffin Passage, east side of Roderick Island, 9.70 ha.
Ulthakoush 11, at head of Laredo Inlet on Princess Royal Island, 2.40 ha.
Weeteeam 3, at mouth of Kdelmashan Creek, southwest shore of Aristazabal Island, 3.20 ha.

Chief and Councillors

BC Treaty Process
The Kitasoo/Xaixais First Nation is at Stage 4 in the British Columbia Treaty Process.

Demographics
INAC number 540, the Kitasoo First Nation has 503 members.

References

Heiltsuk
Tsimshian governments
North Coast of British Columbia